Cella Dati is a comune (municipality) in the Province of Cremona in the Italian region Lombardy, located about  southeast of Milan and about  east of Cremona.

Cella Dati borders the following municipalities: Cingia de' Botti, Derovere, Motta Baluffi, Pieve San Giacomo, San Daniele Po, Sospiro.

References

Cities and towns in Lombardy